The Trobriand Islands are a  archipelago of coral atolls off the east coast of New Guinea. They are part of the nation of Papua New Guinea and are in Milne Bay Province. Most of the population of 12,000 indigenous inhabitants live on the main island of Kiriwina, which is also the location of the government station, Losuia.

Other major islands in the group are Kaileuna, Vakuta, and Kitava. The group is considered to be an important tropical rainforest ecoregion in need of conservation.

Geography
The Trobriands consist of four main islands, the largest being Kiriwina Island, and the others being Kaileuna, Vakuta and Kitava. In the 1980s, there were around sixty villages on the island, containing around 12,000 people, while the other islands were restricted to a population of hundreds. Other than some elevation on Kiriwina, the islands are flat coral atolls and "remain hot and humid throughout the year, with frequent rainfall."

People

History

The first European visitor to the islands was the French ship Espérance in 1793. The ship's navigator, Antoine Bruni d'Entrecasteaux, named them after his first lieutenant, Denis de Trobriand. 

Whaling ships called at the islands for food, water and wood in the 1850s and 1860s.

The first European to settle in the Trobriand islands was a Methodist minister Samuel Benjamin Fellows and his wife Sarah Margaret Fellows who moved to the island of Kiriwina in 1894. He was followed a decade later by colonial officers from Australia who set up a governmental station nearby, and soon a small colony began to be set up by foreign traders on the island. Then in the 1930s, the Sacred Heart Catholic Mission set up a settlement containing a primary school nearby. It was following this European colonisation that the name "Trobriand" was legally adopted for this group of islands.

The first anthropologist to study the Trobrianders was C. G. Seligman, who focused on the Massim people of mainland New Guinea. Seligman was followed a number of years later by his student, the Polish Bronisław Malinowski, who visited the islands during the First World War. Despite being a citizen of the Austro-Hungarian empire, which was at war with Australia which then controlled the Trobriand Islands, he was allowed to stay (provided he checked in with authorities every now and then). His descriptions of the kula exchange system, gardening, magic, and sexual practices—all classics of modern anthropological writing—prompted many foreign researchers to visit the societies of the island group and study other aspects of their cultures. The psychoanalyst Wilhelm Reich drew on Malinowski's studies of the islands in writing his The Invasion of Compulsory Sex Morality and consequently in developing his theory of sex economy in his 1936 work .

In 1943, Allied troops landed on the islands as a part of Operation Cartwheel, the Allied advance to Rabaul. 

In the 1970s, some indigenous peoples formed anti-colonial associations and political movements.

In October 2022 there was an outbreak of tribal fighting on Kiriwina Island between the Kulumata and Kuboma people, which was reported to have been triggered by a death during fighting at a football match. At least 30 people died. While fights between different groups were not uncommon, this was the first time they had resulted in a large number of deaths.

Trobriand Islands in the modern day

Growing population 
Since 1975, the government of Papua New Guinea has had political control of the island. In this time of growth, the population of the island is expanding quickly. Therefore, more land has been cleared to accommodate the increasing population. However, environmental concerns - such as deforestation - are affecting the islands. The government often sends social workers to increase the use of birth control and contraception. However, the Trobriand culture is not receptive to outside influences dictating their reproductive norms. This means that sex is "the most natural thing in the culture". Another effect of Trobriand promiscuity is the rapid spread of HIV/AIDS caused by foreigners on the island. The first documented case of HIV/AIDS was reported in 2001. Nowadays, HIV has become a major health problem. Since young Trobrianders often have multiple sexual partners before marriage, it is hard to slow the spread of the disease. "The moralistic tropes of risk and promiscuity that dominate the language of HIV prevention are not easily accommodated by Trobriand ideations of sexuality, which celebrate premarital sexual activity as healthy and life-affirming, and which stress the productive values of reciprocity and relations of difference."

Income inequality 
After statehood in 1975, the Trobriand Islands' economy has been restructured to fit a tourist and export market. Most Trobrianders live on less than one dollar a day. Since food has been traditionally distributed among the people based on their need, there has been little need for a currency-based economy outside of the Kula rings. To counteract this lack of hard currency, several western goods stores have opened on the islands and created most of the foreign goods market. These stores are multimillion-dollar enterprises. However, most Trobrianders struggle to pay for goods from these stores because they only take cash. Due to this practice, there are often reports of unrest because of a lack of funds. One remedy that many islanders seek is to sell cultural artifacts and relics to tourists in exchange for their currency. For example, a worker can spend 10 days working on a ceremonial turtle bowl and only get paid $10. "However this commercialization is often done sanctimoniously. " "They protect their cultural identity and use it as a tourist commodity". However, one of the items imported that cause economic and social problems is betel nuts. They are a major narcotic on the island. Due to this new currency-based economy there is more reported crime on the islands. There is a great economic disparity due to the income inequality between the modern world and the Trobriands.

Education 
In addition to missionary schools, there are public schools on the Trobriands which were introduced by the government of Papua New Guinea "All children are required to go to school". The required subjects are English, Maths, Science and culture. Schools also educate students about current international events. Maths is the favorite subject among the students of the island. On Wednesdays, the children are required to dress in traditional garb as part of the government-mandated culture day. During this time, children are encouraged to explore Trobriand culture, history and values.

Malinowski's plaque in Kiriwina 

There is a commemorative plaque dedicated to Bronisław Malinowski in Omarakana village, the residence village of the Paramount Chief of Trobriand Islands. The current chief Pulayasi Daniel is positive that it is placed in the very same place where Malinowski's tent used to stand at the beginning of the 20th century. There are two inscriptions on it – one in Polish and one in English – which say: "Toboma Miskabati Bronislaw Malinowski (1884-1942) Notable scientist The son of the Polish nation Father of the modern social anthropology Friend of Trobriand Islands peoples and the populizer of their culture" (see: picture). The plaque was brought to Kiriwina by sailors Monika Bronicka and Mariusz Delgas who took it from New Zealand where it was left by two other yachts: "Maria" and "Victoria". The plaque was sponsored by Jagiellonian University in Cracow and the National Museum in Stettin, Poland.

Tourism and artist visits
The Trobriand Islands are South Sea islands that have so far been little developed for tourism. In 2012 the German painter Ingo Kühl made studies on the kula culture in Kiriwina and Port Moresby.

Calendar 
The Trobriand Islands have a unique lunar calendar system. There are twelve or thirteen lunar cycles, but only ten are fixed: the others constitute free time. The calendar year begins with the sighting of a worm that appears to spawn, which initiates the Milamak festival. The concept of time in these islands is not linear, and so they only have one tense in their language.

Anthropological studies and pop culture references

Books by Malinowski about the Trobriands
 Argonauts of the Western Pacific (1922)
 The Sexual Life of Savages in North-Western Melanesia (1929)
 Coral Gardens and their Magic (1935)

Other books about the Trobriands
 The Trobrianders of Papua New Guinea (1988) by Annette B. Weiner
 The Happy Isles Of Oceania (1992) by Paul Theroux
 Women of value, men of renown (1994) by Annette B. Weiner
 The Trobiand Islanders' Way of Speaking (2010) by Gunter Senft
 Islands of Love, Islands of Risk: Culture and HIV in the Trobriands (2012) by Katherine Lepani
 MacCarthy, Michelle (2012). Playing Politics with Yams: Food Security in the Trobriand Islands of Papua New Guinea. Culture, Agriculture, Food & Environment, 34(2), 136-147. 
 Making the Modern Primitive: Cultural Tourism in the Trobriand Islands (2016) by Michelle MacCarthy
 Connelly, Andrew James, (2007). Counting coconuts : patrol reports from the Trobriand Islands Territory of Papua, 1907-1934. Sacramento, Calif.: California State University. OCLC Number: 317867984.
Trees, Knots, and Outriggers: Environmental Knowledge in the Northeast Kula Ring (2017) by Frederick Damon
Ways of Baloma: Rethinking Magic and Kinship from the Trobriands (2017) by Mark Mosko

Trobriand Islands in popular culture
 The Trobriand Islands were featured in The Young Indiana Jones Chronicles in the episode "Treasure of the Peacock's Eye" when Indy and his friend Remy were marooned there and met Bronisław Malinowski.
 The Trobriand Islands were mentioned in an episode of Married... With Children when Bud Bundy was studying them for an anthropology final.
 The Trobriand Islands were featured in an episode of Worlds Apart on National Geographic Channel
 The Trobriand Islands, and the system of sexual mores unique to its inhabitants, are mentioned in the book Brave New World by Aldous Huxley as the basis for the sexual morality that exists in the book's dystopian society.
The Trobriand Islands are mentioned in the paranormal romance novel The Werewolf in the North Woods by Vicki Lewis Thompson.
The Trobriand Islands are mentioned in the human sexuality book Sex at Dawn by Christopher Ryan and Cacilda Jethá.
The Trobriand Islands are mentioned in Ian McEwan's 2019 novel Machines Like Me.
The Trobriand Islands are mentioned in Malcolm Gladwell's 2019 narrative nonfiction book, Talking to Strangers.
In Gore Vidal's book Myra Breckinridge, Myra introduces herself by stating she destroyed the elite of the Tobriand island. The implication is that she is so sexually provocative and liberated that she can destroy an already sexually free nation.
The Trobriand Islands are the setting for the novel The Visitants by Randolph Stow.  Stow had spent time in the Trobriands as a cadet patrol officer in the late 1950s.

See also
Trobriand cricket

References

External links

 Trobriand Islands Online
 Sorcery and Seduction The Art of Influence in the Trobriands — A travel story about the Trobriands by Roderick Eime
  Lineal and Non-Lineal Codifications of Reality by Dorothy Lee
 
Malinowski fieldwork photographs of the Trobriand Islands (1915–18) held at London School of Economics Archives
 Map including the Trobriand Islands

 
Archipelagoes of Papua New Guinea
Islands of Milne Bay Province
Tropical and subtropical moist broadleaf forests
Matriarchy